Harry Hines Woodring (May 31, 1887September 9, 1967) was an American politician. A Democrat, he was the 25th Governor of Kansas and the United States Assistant Secretary of War from 1933 to 1936. His most important role was Secretary of War in President Franklin Delano Roosevelt's cabinet from 1936 to 1940. After 1938 Roosevelt rejected isolationism regarding Europe. Woodring quietly opposed Roosevelt and was eventually fired.

Biography
Harry Hines Woodring was born in 1887 in Elk City, Kansas, the son of farmer and Union Army soldier Hines Woodring. He was educated in city and county schools and at sixteen began work as a janitor. He attended Lebanon Business University in Lebanon, Indiana, for one year, which gained him employment as a bookkeeper and assistant cashier of the First National Bank in Elk City.

Career
Woodring soon became assistant cashier at the First National Bank of Neodesha.  Woodring moved up quickly to become vice president and owner of the bank until he enlisted as a private in the U.S. Army. He was later commissioned as a second lieutenant in the Tank Corps in World War I. He was elected department commander of the American Legion in Kansas then in 1928 he sold his banking business to enter politics.

Governor of Kansas
Woodring won the Kansas gubernatorial election of 1930 in a controversial three-way race with Republican Frank Haucke and write-in candidate and goat-gland transplantation specialist, John Brinkley. Brinkley won the most votes, but the state only counted ballots with J. R. Brinkley written in, disqualifying tens of thousands of ballots with variants like John Brinkley written in. Woodring himself admitted he would have lost, had all Brinkley's votes been counted. Woodring served as governor of Kansas from 1931 to 1933. As the only Democrat elected to a statehouse office, his efforts to cut expenditures were largely blocked by Republicans, so he cut his own salary and the highway department, the one place where Democrats had control.

Woodring ran for re-election in 1932, but lost to Republican Alf Landon in a three-way race, again featuring John Brinkley.

On July 25, 1933, Woodring married Helen Coolidge, with whom he had three children.  Coolidge was the daughter of United States Senator Marcus A. Coolidge.

War Department
Woodring served as Assistant Secretary of War from 1933 to 1936, with supervision over procurement matters. He was promoted and served as Secretary of War in the Roosevelt cabinet from 1936 to 1940. He continued the recommendations of his predecessor for increasing the strength of the Regular Army, National Guard, and the Reserve Corps. During his tenure he directed a revision of mobilization plans to bring personnel and procurement into balance and stressed the need to perfect the initial (peacetime) protective force.

A strict non-interventionist, Woodring came under pressure from other cabinet members to resign in the first year of World War II. Secretary of the Interior Harold Ickes met with Roosevelt at least twice to call for Woodring's firing, but FDR was at first unwilling to do so, instead appointing outspoken interventionist Louis A. Johnson as Woodring's assistant secretary of war. Woodring and Johnson were immediately at odds, and quickly reached the point where they refused to speak to each other. On June 20, 1940, Roosevelt ended the struggle by finally firing Woodring, replacing him with long-time Republican politician Henry Stimson. Woodring remained isolationist, opposing the Selective Training and Service Act of 1940.

Woodring ran unsuccessfully for Governor of Kansas in 1946, and for the Democratic Party nomination for that post in 1956.

Death
Woodring died following a stroke in Topeka, Kansas, on September 9, 1967, at the age of 80. He is buried at the Mount Hope Cemetery in Topeka.

References

Bibliography

Further reading
 McFarland, Keith Donavon. "Secretary of War Harry H. Woodring and the Problems of Readiness, Rearmament and Neutrality, 1936-1940" (PhD dissertation The Ohio State University; ProQuest Dissertations Publishing, 1969.6922177).
Book Reviews From Parameters,  Autumn 2006, pp. 124–49.

External links

 
National Governors Association
Kansapedia
The Evening Independent
Publications concerning Kansas Governor Woodring's administration available via the KGI Online Library

|-

|-

|-

|-

1887 births
1967 deaths
People from Montgomery County, Kansas
People from Wilson County, Kansas
Military personnel from Kansas
United States Army officers
United States Army personnel of World War I
Democratic Party governors of Kansas
United States Secretaries of War
American Disciples of Christ
Franklin D. Roosevelt administration cabinet members
20th-century American politicians
United States Assistant Secretaries of War